Stoops is an unincorporated community within Montgomery County, Kentucky, United States. Its post office  is closed.

References

Unincorporated communities in Montgomery County, Kentucky
Unincorporated communities in Kentucky